Indalencio Pascoal Froilano de Mello (17 May 1887 – 9 January 1955) was a Goan microbiologist, medical scientist, professor, author and an independent MP in the Portuguese parliament.

During his scientific career, Mello was responsible for the discovery of thousands of protozoa, parasites and microbes which today bear the Latin names given by him, followed by his own surname. He served as mayor of Panjim from 1938–1945. During his tenure as an MP from 1945–1949, he represented the constituency of Portuguese India, namely its overseas provinces of Goa, Daman and Diu in the National Assembly at Lisbon.

Early life
Froilano de Mello was born in Benaulim, Salcette to Goan Catholic parents. He was the eldest son of the lawyer Constâncio Francisco de Mello, and Delfina Rodrigues, the daughter of Dr. Raimundo Venâncio Rodrigues. Rodrigues was the mayor of Coimbra, member of the Cortes Gerais in Portugal and one of the first directors of Goa Medical College (then known as the Escola Medico–Cirurgica de Goa).
Constâncio died when he was twelve, adversely affected the Mello family's fortunes, and brought about difficult times for the entire family. The income generated from the family properties managed by the caretaker was insufficient to meet the family's needs and consequently, the young Froilano had to work while he studied. He graduated in Panjim as a medical doctor, and later repeated the course at Porto, Portugal. In 1910, he returned to Goa with an additional diploma in Tropical medicine of the University of Lisbon.

Academic and scientific career

Mello's academic career got a start in 1910, at the age of 23, when he was appointed as a professor at the prestigious Goa Medical College. From 1913–14, he served as an assistant professor at the University of Sorbonne in Paris, and was a visiting professor at the University of Porto in 1921. Mello was promoted to the post of director of the Goa Medical College's Bacteriological institute, a small shed in Campal which would serve as the center of his scientific research from 1914–1945. His achievements in microbiology and parasitology made the institute world-famous largely because he ensured that all his works were simultaneously published in English, Portuguese and French. Mello would later go on to become the college's dean.

During the same period, he also served as Chief of Public Health for Portuguese India. He undertook a postgraduate course in parasitology in Kaiser Willhelm Institute fuer Biologie, Berlin, and at the Max Planck Institute, Potsdam, Germany from 1922–23. In 1922, at the age of 35, Mello became a Colonel in the Portuguese Army Medical Corps, achieving the highest rank in the medical military hierarchy of that time, exclusively through merits in the medical campaigns on Public Health which he carried out in Goa, Daman, Diu, and in Angola. Mello was the head of a Portuguese delegation to the World Leprosy Conference in Cuba and is known to have attended at least 40 World Conferences, including the All India Sanitary Conference in Lucknow (1914) and the Third Entomological Meeting in Lucknow (1914) where, at the invitation of the Governor-General of India, he lectured on medical mycology. His researches in tropical medicine brought him international fame and recognition as a world-renowned expert on the subject. Mello published more than 200 research papers on bacteriology in Portuguese, French and English journals. He founded the following medical journals in Goa, Boletim Geral de Medicina, Arquivos Indo-Portugueses de Medicina e Historia Natural, and Arquivos da Escola Medico–Cirurgica de Nova Goa. His work in French entitled, A la veille du Centenaire (On the eve of the Centenary) elaborated in great detail the contributions of Goa Medical College during the first hundred years of its establishment. Separate from his medical career, Mello also authored a book in 1946 on the Bengali poet, Rabindranath Tagore entitled O Cantico da Vida na Poesia Tagoreana (The song of life in the poetry of Tagore).

Mello was a member of the Royal Asiatic Society of Bengal; the Indian Academy of Sciences; Societie de Pathologie Exotique and Societie de Biologie de Paris in Paris; Sociedade de Ciencias Medicas, Sociedade de Etnologia & Antropologia and  Sociedade de Geografia in Lisbon. He was the recipient of medals of honour from Queen Wilhelmina of the Netherlands in 1938, Pope Pius XII on the occasion of the canonisation of St. John de Brito in 1947, President Ramón Grau of Cuba in 1949, and from President Eurico Gaspar Dutra of Brazil in 1950. He also held the following Portuguese honours: Grande Official da Ordem de Aviz, Comendador da Ordem de São Tiago and Comendador da Ordem de Benemerencia.

Medical campaigns
Mello worked passionately to eradicate tuberculosis in Goa and malaria from Velha Goa. His efforts towards this end, led to the establishment of two important institutions, namely the first leprosarium in Asia at Macasẚna in Salcette in 1934, today known as Leprosaria Froilano de Mello and Dispensario Virgem Peregrina at St. Inez, Panjim. He also established the TB sanitarium in Margao in 1928 and opened a ward for those suffering from leprosy in Daman. In 1926, Mello with the help of one of his pupils, Dr. Luís Bras de Sa, carefully mapped the site of Old Goa and recognised more than 4,800 wells in the area, which were breeding grounds of anopheles mosquitoes. This led to the closure of these wells, and in turn, led to the reduction of the mosquito breeding sites. This factor played a significant role in curbing the Malaria epidemic in Goa in the 1920s.

Mello also undertook new measures to improve urban sanitation, which included the introduction of Sanitary Police in Panjim. Faced with the task of dealing with the city's rabies epidemic during his term as mayor, he ordered the elimination of all stray dogs, offering a reward per stray dog. This resulted in a dramatic reduction in the number of cases of rabies. A similar reward was offered for the capture or destruction of venomous snakes, which led to the reduction of snakebites.

Mayor of Panjim (1938–1945)
In 1926, Mello was elected as a member of parliament to represent Portuguese India in Lisbon. However, after the 28 May 1926 coup d'état, the elections were nullified and not held again for the next nineteen years. Mello served as the mayor of Panjim from 1938–45. During his tenure as mayor, he cleansed its stables of mismanagement and fiscal deficits, and his mayorship is widely noted for the city's urbanisation.

In 1940, Mello devised a plan for the beautification of the city, particularly the church square, the present 18 June road and the Campal Zone. The latter still bears the imprint of the program carried out by him. He organised the balustrade on the Mandovi River, from the centre of town up to Campal, lining the riverside avenue. He also planted trees in many of the streets of Panjim, with seeds of tropical trees from Cuba. These jacaranda and acacia trees, whose seedlings were planted in 1940, now provide shade to the streets which were originally lined only with coconut and ficus trees.

Member of Parliament (1945–1949)
In 1945, when the Portuguese parliament was re-opened, Mello was elected for the second time as MP to represent Portuguese India. He was the only independent MP to serve in the Portuguese parliament for the period 1945–49; all the others being members of dictator António de Oliveira Salazar's União Nacional party. However, Mello's independent status brought him into disfavour with Salazar, and his speeches in the National Assembly were censored. Initially, Mello was staunchly pro-Portuguese and believed that Goa should remain under the Portuguese Empire. In November 1946, at a National Assembly meeting at Lisbon, he denounced the unrest in Goa as the handiwork of a few "Fifth Columnists and Nazis, and intellectuals educated in central Europe and fanatics who had failed in life, who preach the absorption of Goa and foment hatred of the Portuguese nation."

He worked tirelessly for the repeal of the discriminatory Portuguese Colonial Act of 1930, which had previously relegated non-Portuguese citizens to second-class status in the Empire. The repeal of this discriminatory act was unanimously approved by the National Assembly in 1950. With the repeal of the act granted, Mello now began to advocate independence for the Portuguese Indian colonies of Goa, Daman and Diu, which would govern itself as a separate national entity, but within the Portuguese Commonwealth. This put him at further odds with the ruling Estado Novo regime, which considered their Indian colonies to be an integral part of Portugal and dismissed any ideas of independence.

Last years
After retiring to Goa, Mello was not put up as candidate for re-election through a political manoeuvre of the Salazar's single party regime. In 1950, when the Fifth International Congress of Microbiology was to take place in Petropolis, Brazil, Mello who had expected to be nominated as the delegate of Portugal, found out to his surprise that Salazar had instead appointed another delegation without him. When this came to be known, the Brazilian Government invited him, providing for his travel and stay.

Finding himself under increased political persecution by Salazar's government in Goa, Mello emigrated with his wife to Brazil in 1951, where three of their children were already settled. He settled down in São Paulo, where he continued his research in the field of Protozoa, in the intestines of termites. He discovered various new species there which he dedicated to his new country. He gave lectures and conferences in Rio de Janeiro and São Paulo and was invited to organise the section of protozoology at the Instituto Ezequiel Dias in Belo Horizonte. Mello died in São Paulo of lung cancer on 9 January 1955, aged 67. His last scientific paper, Memorias do Instituto Ezequiel Dias (Memoirs of the Ezequiel Dias Institute) was published in February 1955, a month after his death.

Personal life
Mello was married twice. His first wife was Marie Eugenie Caillat, an aristocratic Swiss from Geneva, who after marriage moved with him to Panjim. Eugenie was the first person to translate the works of Rabindranath Tagore into French. She died in 1921 from complications brought on by the Spanish flu virus in Porto. The couple did not have any children.

On 15 September 1923, Mello married his second wife Hedwig Bachmann, a young Swiss school teacher from Diessenhofen. They had six children: Alfredo, Eugeήia, Victor, Francisco Paulo, Cristina and Margarida. Hedwig authored a book entitled Von der Seele der Indischen Frau (Tipografia Rangel, Goa, 1941) published also in translation, On the soul of the Indian women. The book is a psycho-sociological study of Hindu traditions as interpreted from proverbs and the impact of Aryan and Dravidian civilisations. One of his sons, Alfredo Bachmann de Mello (1924–2010) was a well-known travel writer and memoirist who authored an auto-biography, From Goa to Patagonia: memoirs spanning times and spaces. Another son, Victor Froilano Bachmann de Mello (1927–2009) was a world-renowned geotechnical engineer.

Selected work

Malaria
 Contribution to the study of Malaria in Goa, All India Sanitary Conference, Lucknow, 1914.
 , Primeira Conferencia Sanitaria de Goa, Panjim, 1914. Also in Boletim Geral de Medecina e Farmacia, Nova Goa, 1914.
 , Ibid., 1914.
 , "Transactions of the VII Congress of the Far East Association of Tropical Medicine", Calcutta, 1928.
 , Boletim Geral de Medecina e Farmacia, Panjim, 1929.
 , Presse Médicale, Paris, September 1929.
 , Bulletin Soc. Pathologie Exotique, Paris, 1929.
Also in Boletim Geral de Medecina e Farmacia, Nova Goa 1930.
 , Bulletin Soc. Pathologie Exotique Paris, June 1931.
 A scheme for malarial sanitation in rural areas, The Antiseptic, Madras, September 1933.
 Premiere Campagne Antimalarienne active E0 Goa, Arquivo da Escola Medico Cirugica, Nova Goa, Seria B, 1934.
 . – Ibid, 1934.
 On the mass chemoprophylaxis of malarial areas and its practical results, Medicina, Lisbon, 1935.
 , Jornadas Medicas Galaico-Portuguesas, Orense, 1935. Also in Portugal Medico, Poro, May 1936.
 Experimental studies on the treatment of malarial splenomgalies by the method of Ascoli, South Africa Medical Journal, November 1938. Also in the Compt Rendues du Congres de 1st South Africa Medical Association, Lourenco Marques, 1939.
  A Medecina Contemporanea, Lisbon, November 1938.
  Rivista Malariologia, Rome, 1938.
  Clinica, Higiene e Hidrologia, Lisbon, 1936.
 Treatment of malaria with special reference to the chemoprophylaxis of malaria in Portuguese India, South African Medical Journal, December 1938. Also in O Medico, Nova Goa, 1939.
  Acta Conventius Tertii de Tropicis ut que Malaria Morbis (Congress of Amsterdam, 1938).
  A Medecina Contemporanea, Lisbon, August 1937, Also in Boletim Geral de Medecina e Farmacia, Nova Goa, 1938.

TuberculosisEstado Actual da Ciencia sobre a tuberculose pulmonar, Boletim Geral de Medecina e Farmacia, Nova Goa, 1912.Une nouvelle conception sur le mode d'action des tuberculines, Ibid, 1913.Um caso de antracose pulmonar simulando a tuberculose, Ibid, 1917.
 Un programe a suivre dans la declaration obligatoire de la tuberculose a l'Inde Portugaise, Revue d'hygiene et police Sanitaire, Paris, 1914.
 Conferencia Provincial sobre a Tuberculose, Boletim Geral de Medecina e Farmacia, Nova Goa, 1934.

Leprosy
  Presse Médicale, Paris, 1921.
  A Medecina Ibera, Madrid, 1925.
  communicated to the Congreso Luso Espanhol meeting in Coimbra, Boletim Geral de Medecina e Farmacia, Nova Goa, 1925.
  Presse Médicale, Paris, 1925.
  Arquivos Indo Portugueses de Medicina e Historia Natural, Vol IV, 1927.
  Die Medizin Welt, Berlin, October 1928.
 Une croisade internationale, combattant la Lepre, simultanement dans tous les pays, pourrait eteindre ce fleau en quelques decades, Cogres de Medicine Tropicale du Caire, 1928.
  Revue D'hygeine et de Medicine Preventive NBA V, Paris, 1931
 Treatment of Leprosy by intravenous injections of pure Chaulmogra oil, Medical Digest, Bombay, August 1935.
  Arquivo da Escola Medico Cirugica, Nova Goa, Serie B, 1915.
  XI Congres International de Dermatologie de Budapest, 1935
  Jornadas Medicas Galaico-Portuguesas, Orense, 1935. Also in Portugal Medico, Porto, 1936.
 Leprosaria Central de Goa (Relatorio), Arquivo da Escola Medico Cirugica, Nova Goa, Serie B, 1937
  II Semaine Medicale Internationale, Montreux, 1935.
  – Lecture in the Liga da Profilaxia Social, Porto, Volume das Conferencias, 1939. Also in Boletim Geral de Medecina e Farmacia,'' Nova Goa, 1938.

Citations

References

.

1887 births
1955 deaths
Scientists from Goa
Deaths from lung cancer
People from Benaulim
Portuguese people of Goan descent
Brazilian people of Goan descent
Portuguese Roman Catholics
Brazilian Roman Catholics
Indian Roman Catholics
Portuguese microbiologists
Brazilian microbiologists
Portuguese bacteriologists
Brazilian bacteriologists
Indian bacteriologists
Portuguese leprologists
Brazilian leprologists
Indian leprologists
Portuguese colonial governors and administrators
Portuguese politicians of Indian descent
Portuguese scientists
Brazilian scientists
Portuguese male writers
Brazilian male writers
Scholars from Goa
Mayors of places in Goa
20th-century Indian biologists
Portuguese soldiers
Portuguese exiles
Brazilian people of Indian descent